Robinsons Valencia (formerly Robinsons Place Valencia) is a three level full-service shopping mall located in Valencia, Bukidnon. The mall opened on December 12, 2018. Robinsons Place Valencia is the first national brand mall in the province of Bukidnon, the 51st Robinsons mall in the country and the seventh Robinsons mall in Mindanao.

Development
The centerpiece design of the mall was inspired by pineapple fruit, of which the province of Bukidnon is well known of, and was built on an area of 80 thousand square meters. The interiors as well were pineapple inspired, of which the pillars of the atrium have yellow color and diamond pattern, and the seating areas were shaped like sliced pineapples. The mall was designed by Lichauco Guillas + Villanueva, who also designed Robinsons Place Naga.

Anchor stores
 Robinsons Department Store
 Robinsons Supermarket
 Robinsons Appliances
 Robinsons Movieworld
 Toys "R" Us
 Handyman
 Daiso Japan

References

External links
 

Robinsons Malls
Shopping malls in the Philippines
Shopping malls established in 2018
Valencia, Bukidnon
Bukidnon
Buildings and structures in Bukidnon